Abdelkrim Motii (born 25 November 1935 in Ben Ahmed) is the co-founder with Kamal Ibrahim of Chabiba islamia ("Islamic Youth") in 1969.

After being accused of implication in the December 18, 1975, assassination of Omar Benjelloun a leftist leader and journalist, Motii fled to Saudi Arabia where he was involved in the 1979 Grand Mosque seizure in Mecca. He subsequently fled again to Libya where he is believed to live now in exile. He has since adopted a much more moderate attitude and declared that he is ready to go back to Morocco if he is offered enough guarantees.

Notes

Living people
Moroccan exiles
Moroccan Islamists
Moroccan politicians
Moroccan expatriates in Libya
1935 births
People from Ben Ahmed
Moroccan schoolteachers
20th-century Moroccan educators